A pulk (from ; ;) is a Nordic short, low-slung small sled used in sport or for transport, pulled by a dog or a skier, or in Sápmi pulled by reindeer. They are classically made out of wood and other natural materials but are nowadays made of plastic, which makes them inexpensive.

Pulks are originally meant to carry supplies such as a tent or food, or transport a child or other person. In Norway and Sweden, pulks are often used by parents to pull small children on skiing trips. In Finland and Sweden, pulks exist as a winter toy, mainly for children, for going downhill. Besides the classic toy pulk there are similar alternatives like "saucers" (pulks shaped like a disc), as well as sleighs of different configurations.

A larger pulk, designed for transporting larger amounts of goods, is called ahkio  in Finnish. This word is also used by the US Army for a human-drawn snow sled.

See also

 Bum slider
 Mushing
 Skijoring
 Toboggan

References

External links
 ACAPULKA  international pulk/pulka website
 The Gear Junkie, a syndicated U.S. newspaper columnist, has an in-depth review of a pulk
 XC Ski World reviews of XC ski sleds
 Ski Randonne Nordique A French pulk website (in French)
 Laughing Daw blog Building a Backcountry Pulk
 Madriver Rocket Instructions to build a pulk

Dog sports
Cross-country skiing
Sliding vehicles
Finnish inventions
Human-powered vehicles